Suzanne Jane Pinnington MBE (196624 July 2021) was a British Anglican priest. She served as Archdeacon of the Gwent Valleys in the Church in Wales Diocese of Monmouth from 2018 until her death in office.

Pinnington was educated at Trevelyan College, Durham and St Stephen's House, Oxford. She was ordained deacon in 1997, and priest in 1998. After a curacy in Oakham she was Rector of Houghton le Spring until her appointment as archdeacon. She was collated archdeacon on 7 July 2018.

Pinnington died on 24 July 2021.

References

Members of the Order of the British Empire
1966 births
2021 deaths
21st-century  Welsh Anglican priests
20th-century English Anglican priests
Alumni of St Stephen's House, Oxford
Archdeacons of the Gwent Valleys
Alumni of Trevelyan College, Durham
Women Anglican clergy